Sofia Blüthgen Skriver (born 7 June 2003) is a Danish ice hockey player and member of the Danish national ice hockey team, currently playing with Luleå HF/MSSK of the Swedish Women's Hockey League (SDHL).

Skriver represented Denmark at the Division I Group A tournament of IIHF Women's World Championship in 2019 and at the Top Division tournament in 2021. She also played in the qualification tournament for the 2022 Winter Olympics, at which the Danes earned an Olympic berth for the first time. As a junior player with the Danish national under-18 team, she participated in the IIHF Women's U18 World Championship Division I Group B tournament in 2018 and the Division I Group A tournaments in 2019 and 2020.

References

External links
 

Living people
2003 births
People from Silkeborg
Danish women's ice hockey forwards
Luleå HF/MSSK players
Danish expatriate ice hockey people
Danish expatriate sportspeople in Sweden
Expatriate ice hockey players in Sweden
Ice hockey players at the 2022 Winter Olympics
Olympic ice hockey players of Denmark
Sportspeople from the Central Denmark Region